Repurposing is the process by which an object with one use value is transformed or redeployed as an object with an alternative use value.

Description
Repurposing is as old as human civilization, with many contemporary scholars investigating that way that different societies re-appropriate the artifacts of older cultures in new and creative ways. More recently, repurposing has been celebrated by 21st century hobbyists and arts-and-crafts organizations such as Instructables and other Maker culture communities as a means of creatively responding to the ecological and economic crises of the 21st century.  Recent scholarship has attempted to relate these activities to American left- and right-libertarianism.

Repurposing is the use of a tool being re-channeled into being another tool, usually for a purpose unintended by the original tool-maker. Typically, repurposing is done using items usually considered to be junk, garbage, or obsolete. A good example of this would be the Earthship style of house, that uses tires as insulating walls and bottles as glass walls. Reuse is not limited to repeated uses for the same purpose.  Examples of repurposing include using tires as boat fenders and steel drums or plastic drums as feeding troughs and/or composting bins. Incinerator and power plant exhaust stack fly-ash is used extensively as an additive to concrete, providing increased strength. This type of reuse can sometimes make use of items which are no longer usable for their original purposes, for example using worn-out clothes as rags.

Examples

Art
Appropriation (art) is the use of repurposing pre-existing objects or images with little or no transformation applied to them. The use of appropriation has played a significant role in the history of the arts (audiovisual, literary, musical and performing arts). In the audiovisual arts, to appropriate means to properly adopt, borrow, recycle or sample aspects (or the entire form) of human-made audiovisual culture. Notable in this respect are the Readymades of Marcel Duchamp and sampling in Hip Hop music.
 Steelpan drums are created from oil drums

Automobiles
Full-size vans from the Big Three which have been used for airport shuttle service have been repurposed as church vans mainly because of some depreciation to facilitate affordable cost for thrifty church groups.

Electronics
A USB dead drop can be mounted on a brick wall since this gives an opportunity to repurpose older USB flash drives with obsolete capacities to continue service for file transfer (especially anonymous ones) that don't demand more than one gigabyte.
 Everdrive and other flash video game cartridges have offered opportunities to download ROM images of video game cartridges onto SD cards while offering opportunities to repurpose real vintage video game consoles for retro gameplay.
Old Android smartphones, which tend to have little computing resources yet which are unused and probably contain a triaxial accelerometer of decent specifications, can be used as an amateur seismograph node for a distributed seismography project, e.g., Quake-Catcher Network.
Discarded or new consumer COTS surplus parabolic reflectors intended for use for C band satellite TV reception can be repurposed for a wide gamut of applications for which a consumer-grade reflector of low gain is adequate, incl. amateur microwave SETI (mainly Project Argus), Wi-Fi links, and microwave amateur radio radio beacons.

As a tactic for manufacturing goods
 Right-hand-drive Jeep brand vehicles, such as the Jeep Wrangler, which are initially slated for import to right-hand-drive countries, have had some specially designed versions repurposed for US and Canada postal service mail carrying, in which this tactic of repurposing can consolidate the overhead of retooling for specialty manufacturing of the vehicle.

Manufacturing of recycled goods
Reusable packaging can be reused for a wide variety of other purposes.
 Recycling can also involve repurposing of materials, such as products using recycled paper.

Drugs
 Drug repositioning (also known as "drug repurposing" or "therapeutic switching") is the application of known drugs and compounds to treat new diseases. Examples include Pfizer's Viagra for erectile dysfunction and Celgene's thalidomide for cancer.
 Off-label use

Real property
Real estate, including land and buildings, is routinely adaptive reused for other purposes, both short-term and long-term, due to its high fixed cost. An example is conversion of old industrial mills.

Scrap and household materials
Scrap metal has countless applications for repurposing.
Furniture has countless applications for repurposing.
Kitchen utensils have many unique repurposing opportunities.
Beverage bottles: Water bottles may be repurposed for solar water disinfection. Wat Pa Maha Chedi Kaew is a Buddhist temple in Thailand made from one million discarded beer bottles.
Removed house parts, like doors, also have countless potential repurposing applications.

See also

 Code reuse
 Computer recycling
 Micro-Sustainability
 Planned obsolescence
 Recycling
 Remanufacturing
 Retrocomputing
 Reuse
 Reverse engineering
 Used good
 Waste minimization
 Windowfarm

References

 
Waste management concepts
Reuse
The arts